Walter Henry Cope Bromfield (1884 – 1963) was an Australian philatelist who signed the Roll of Distinguished Philatelists in 1950.

References

Australian philatelists
1884 births
1963 deaths
Signatories to the Roll of Distinguished Philatelists